The 2018–19 CB Miraflores season will be the fourth in existence and their second in the Liga ACB, the top flight of Spanish basketball, of this club, called San Pablo Burgos for sponsorship reasons.

Overview

Players

Squad information

Club

Technical staff

Competitions

Liga ACB

League table

Results summary

Results by round

Matches

Statistics

References

External links
 Official website

Miraflores
CB Miraflores seasons